Clark Township is a civil township of Mackinac County in the U.S. state of Michigan.  As of the 2010 census, the township population was 2,256.

History
Clark Township was established in February 1905 by the consolidation of Sherwood Township and Cedar Township. Cedar Township was established in March 1887.

Communities
 Cedarville is an unincorporated community at the junction of M-129 and M-134 north of the Les Cheneaux Islands, about two miles east of Hessel, and about 35 miles due south of Sault Ste. Marie at   It began as a lumber settlement on the Lake Huron shore in 1884. A post office was established in July 1888.  The ZIP code of 49719 serves most of Clark Township and a portion of eastern Marquette Township. The Les Cheneaux Historical Association  runs the Historical Museum and the Maritime Museum, both in Cedarville. Les Cheneaux Culinary School is also there.
 Coryell Islands in this township had a post office from 1908 until 1958.
It was founded in 1885 by two Swedes and a Norwegian, John and Carl Hessel and John A. Johnson and a post office was established in September 1888. The ZIP code of 49745 serves an area between M-134 and the Lake Huron shore. Hessel is the home of the Antique Wooden Boat Show and Festival of the Arts which is held annually at the public docks on the second weekend of August.
 Patrick Landing is a named place in the township approximately one mile southwest of Cedarville on the Les Cheneaux Channel at 
 Port Dolomite is a commercial port in the eastern end of the township at  In 2004, it was the 93rd largest port in the United States ranked by tonnage.

Geography

Demographics
As of the census of 2000, there were 2,200 people, 952 households, and 674 families residing in the township. There were 1,962 housing units at an average density of 24.8 per square mile (9.6/km2). The racial makeup of the township was 86.73% White, 0.05% African American, 9.95% Native American, 0.36% Asian, 0.27% from other races, and 2.64% from two or more races. Hispanic or Latino of any race were 0.64% of the population.

There were 952 households, out of which 26.7% had children under the age of 18 living with them, 59.1% were married couples living together, 8.4% had a female householder with no husband present, and 29.2% were non-families. 26.3% of all households were made up of individuals, and 12.0% had someone living alone who was 65 years of age or older.  The average household size was 2.31 and the average family size was 2.76.

In the township the population was spread out, with 22.8% under the age of 18, 4.5% from 18 to 24, 23.4% from 25 to 44, 29.8% from 45 to 64, and 19.6% who were 65 years of age or older.  The median age was 45 years. For every 100 females, there were 100.0 males.  For every 100 females age 18 and over, there were 95.1 males.

The median income for a household in the township was $33,975, and the median income for a family was $40,795. Males had a median income of $31,071 versus $21,480 for females. The per capita income for the township was $18,357.  About 6.4% of families and 9.9% of the population were below the poverty line, including 16.3% of those under age 18 and 8.3% of those age 65 or over.

Education
The K-12 educational needs of Clark Township residents are served by Les Cheneaux Community Schools.
Cedarville is home to Great Lakes Boat Building School, a post-secondary school focused on vocational training in the boat building and maritime trades.

References

Notes

Sources

Townships in Mackinac County, Michigan
Townships in Michigan
Populated places on Lake Huron in the United States
Populated places established in 1905
1905 establishments in Michigan